= Sarserho =

Village in Uttar Pradesh, India

Sarserho is a village in Prayagraj, Uttar Pradesh, India.
